Lester Milward Archambeau III (born June 27, 1967) is a former defensive end in the National Football League (NFL). He grew up in Montville, New Jersey and played high school football at Montville Township High School.

References

1967 births
Living people
American football defensive ends
Green Bay Packers players
Atlanta Falcons players
Denver Broncos players
Stanford Cardinal football players
Montville Township High School alumni
Players of American football from New Jersey
People from Montville, New Jersey
Sportspeople from Morris County, New Jersey